WICE-LP is a low-power F.M. radio station licensed to operate on 97.1 MHz at Hendersonville, North Carolina by the Federal Communications Commission. It was assigned the WICE-LP callsign on July 15, 2009.

References

External links
 

ICE-LP
Communications in North Carolina
ICE-LP